Norfolk & Norwich Festival is an arts festival held annually in Norwich, England. 

It is one of the oldest city festivals in England, having been held since 1824 and tracing its roots back further to 1772. It was initially conceived as a fundraiser for the Norfolk & Norwich Hospital. For most of its history was a purely classical musical festival which saw performances by many famous artistes, composers and conductors. In recent years the festival has moved away from this focus, and has diversified to include a variety of circus, performance, contemporary music, dance, visual arts and children's events.

Today Norfolk & Norwich Festival is an arts organisation based in Norwich, England which is primarily responsible for the eponymous international arts festival held annually each May, with events also held throughout the wider county of Norfolk. The Festival organisation works on creative learning schemes across Norfolk with support from Arts Council England and Norwich and Norfolk councils and has received funding to become a "bridge organisation" for Arts Council England from 2012.

Origins

The festival was established as a triennial event in 1824 to support the ongoing construction of the Norfolk & Norwich Hospital, and grew out of earlier musical fundraisers for the hospital dating back as far as 1772 including the annual performance of an oratorio at Norwich Cathedral.

In its early days, the festival was mainly held in St. Andrew's Hall and St Peter Mancroft. These events consisted primarily of oratorios and other large scale choral works performed by the Norwich Festival Chorus, then 300 strong. Noted premieres from this time included The Last Judgement by the German Romantic composer and conductor Louis Spohr. (See list of oratorios, 19th Century)

20th century

The triennial festival continued to develop a reputation throughout the Victorian and Edwardian period, but was suspended during the First World War, being revived under the patronage of Norwich's first female Lord Mayor, Ethel Colman in 1923.

It saw the premieres of significant classical works including Edward Elgar's Sea Pictures in 1899 (sung by Clara Butt), E. J. Moeran's Rhapsody No. 2 for the 1924 centenary concert (based on a Norfolk folksong), Frank Bridge's Enter Spring in 1927, Ralph Vaughan Williams's Job: A Masque for Dancing in 1930, Arthur Bliss's Morning Heroes also in 1930 and Benjamin Britten's Our Hunting Fathers in 1936.

An oft-recounted story from the 1936 festival is of Vaughan Williams's intervention to stop the orchestra mocking the 22-year-old Britten's work. Vaughan Williams told them they were "in the presence of greatness" (referring to the young composer) and that if they did not want to play Britten's work they would not play his (Vaughan Williams was premiering his own Five Tudor Portraits at the same festival).

As a musical festival, it also attracted prestigious musical directors including Sir Henry Wood, Sir Thomas Beecham, Sir Malcolm Sargent, Norman Del Mar and Vernon Handley.

The festival became an annual event in 1989 following an agreement with directors of Festival Norwich (FN). FN was started in 1986 as the first annual festival of arts and music in Norfolk devoted to organising a wide range of activities embracing art, music and industry in Norfolk. The directors of the Triennial were approached with the proposal that FN would run for two consecutive years with the Triennial continuing every third year. However, the Triennial decided that it should be an annual event itself and it was agreed that in this case FN would cease functioning after only three years. 
Under the direction of Marcus Davey, now director of The Roundhouse in London, the scope of the festival was changed from classical music to cater for a larger variety of music, theatre, dance and other visual arts. As part of the widening of the festival's scope, a new art initiative called "First Norfolk and Norwich Festival Visual Arts Week" was begun in 1994, which has now evolved into Norfolk & Norwich Open Studios, an open gallery event.

21st century

A significant change in 2001 was the moving of the festival from October to May. From 2004 to 2010 it was under the direction of Jonathan Holloway, now Artistic Director of the Melbourne Festival in Australia. During the years Jonathan was Artistic Director and Chief Executive of the Norfolk & Norwich Festival, audiences increased by 1,000%, turnover more than quadrupled and the Festival took over delivery of Creative Partnerships in Norfolk, part of the UK flagship creativity in schools programme.

Composers who visited the Festival during this period include Philip Glass, Ute Lemper, Michael Nyman, John Cale and Laurie Anderson, Terry Riley, Ray Davies and David Bedford have also performed at the festival.

The 2010 programme featured the Michael Clark Company, 7 doigts de la main, Ontroerend Goed, Nofit State Circus, Circus Ronaldo and Forced Entertainment (amongst others) and 2011 featured Artichoke's Dining with Alice, Chouf Ouchouf, Mariano Pensotti, Mariza and Kronos Quartet among others. Recent musical commissions include Dan Jones's Music For Seven Ice Cream Vans. Holloway was succeeded by William Galinsky, formerly the organiser of the Cork Midsummer Festival in Ireland. In October 2017, it was announced that Daniel Brine would be taking over as Festival Director.

2020 saw the festival go on hiatus caused by COVID-19 pandemic and will return in 2021.

Creative partnerships and bridge schemes
The Festival was the main East Anglian participant in the creative learning schools' programme, working with 49 Norfolk schools. The Creative Partnerships scheme has been cut by the government, but from 2012/13 the Festival will receive a total of £1.35 million annually from Arts Council England to enable it to become a bridge organisation for developing arts opportunities for children and young people, acting as a bridge between the arts and education sectors.

Directors
 Sir Henry Wood (1908–1930)
 Sir Thomas Beecham (1936 –
 Norman Del Mar
 Vernon Handley
 Richard Philips
 Heather Newell
 Marcus Davey (1995-1999)
 Jonathan Holloway (2004–2010)
 William Galinsky (2011 – 2017)
 Daniel Brine (2017-present)

References

External links 
Norfolk and Norwich Festival

Culture in Norwich
Arts festivals in England
Festivals in Norfolk
Festivals established in 1824